A security association (SA) is the establishment of shared security attributes between two network entities to support secure communication. An SA may include attributes such as: cryptographic algorithm and mode; traffic encryption key; and parameters for the network data to be passed over the connection. The framework for establishing security associations is provided by the Internet Security Association and Key Management Protocol (ISAKMP).  Protocols such as Internet Key Exchange (IKE) and Kerberized Internet Negotiation of Keys (KINK) provide authenticated keying material.

An SA is a simplex (one-way channel) and logical connection which endorses and provides a secure data connection between the network devices. The fundamental requirement of an SA arrives when the two entities communicate over more than one channel. Take, for example, a mobile subscriber and a base station. The subscriber may subscribe itself to more than one service. Therefore, each service may have different service primitives, such as a data encryption algorithm, public key, or initialization vector. To make things easier, all of this security information is grouped logically, and the logical group itself is a Security Association. Each SA has its own ID called SAID. So both the base station and mobile subscriber will share the SAID, and they will derive all the security parameters. 

In other words, an SA is a logical group of security parameters that enable the sharing of information to another entity.

See also
IPsec
Virtual private network (VPN)

Notes

References
Internet Key Exchange (IKEv2) Protocol - RFC 5996

IPsec
Cryptography